A billionaire is a person with a net worth of at least one billion (1,000,000,000, i.e., a thousand million) units of a given currency, usually of a major currency such as the United States dollar, euro, or pound sterling. The American business magazine Forbes produces a global list of known U.S. dollar billionaires every year and updates an Internet version of this list in real-time. The American oil magnate John D. Rockefeller became the world's first confirmed U.S. dollar billionaire in 1916.

According to a 2017 Oxfam report, the top eight richest billionaires own as much combined wealth as "half the human race". As of 2021, eight people have reached the status of USD hectobillionaires, meaning that each has had a net worth of at least $100 billion.

Current U.S. dollar billionaires 

According to the UBS/PwC Billionaires Report 2019 report released in November 2019, there are currently 2,101 U.S. dollar billionaires worldwide, from 66 countries, with a combined net worth of $8.5 trillion. Also according to the report, billionaires have a substantial positive impact on the sustainability and success of companies controlled by them. Billionaire-controlled companies listed on the equity market returned 17.8 percent, compared with the 9.1 percent of the MSCI AC World Index. According to the authors of the report, this Billionaire Effect is connected with smart risk-taking and willingness to plan and invest for the long term. 

The majority of billionaires are male, as fewer than 11% (197 of 1,826) on the 2015 list were female billionaires.  The United States has the largest number of billionaires of any country, with 536 , while China, India and Russia are home to 213, 90 and 88 billionaires, respectively. , only 46 billionaires were under the age of 40, while the list of American-only billionaires, as of 2010, had an average age of 66.

Different authorities use different methodologies to determine net worth and to rank them, and not all information about personal finances is publicly available. In 2019, Forbes counted a record 607 billionaires in the U.S.. Over the course of the 2020s, depending on the source and the year, the world's richest person has been reckoned to be Jeff Bezos, Bernard Arnault and family, or Elon Musk.

Education and work experience 

Billionaires come from a very wide number of backgrounds. A review of the education and work histories of the top 400 billionaires shows little correlation between education and success. Nearly 30% of billionaires do not have a college degree, greatly exceeding any other educational background. The most common field of university education was finance and economics, which only contributed to a combined 15.5% of billionaire educations.
There is little correlation between any university and becoming a billionaire. The top 10 Universities produced just 99 of the top 400 billionaires combined, significantly less than the total number of billionaires who were not college educated. Military service produced 21 billionaires, more than any single University.

Very few college-educated billionaires pursued business interests in their field of study, with the exception of computer science majors. All twelve of the twelve computer science major billionaires worked in computer science, while only half of Engineers worked in Engineering, and less than a quarter of finance and economics majors ever worked in finance or economics. The most common field for billionaires to enter was sales and military service.

Inequality 

According to a 2016 Oxfam report, the wealth of the poorest 95% dropped by 38% between 2010 and 2015, due to an increase in the global population of 400 million. In the same period, the wealth of the richest 62 people between the World's Billionaires increased by $500bn (£350bn) to $1.76tn. More recently, in 2017 an Oxfam report noted that just eight billionaires have as much net worth as "half the human race". However, the Oxfam report has been criticized for considering debt as negative wealth, which leads to wealthy people with large amounts of debt to be considered poor or not wealthy.

Rise of new members
In 2019, 19 people became billionaires. Four of the members joined as a result of death or divorce, including Julia Koch and Jeff Bezos's former wife Mackenzie Scott.

New members now also include more and more women. In the last five years, the number of female billionaires has grown by 46 percent, that is more than the number of male billionaires in the same period (39 percent). There are now 233 female billionaires in the world, a steep growth from 160 in 2013.

Statistics 
These aggregated statistics for billionaires include the total number of known billionaires and the net worth of the world's wealthiest individual for each year since 2008. Data for each year is from the annual Forbes list of billionaires, with currency figures given in U.S. dollars. Data since 2018 also includes the Wealth-X billionaire census which typically finds higher numbers than Forbes.

See also 

 Bloomberg Billionaires Index (global)
 Forbes 400 (US citizens only)
 Foundation
 List of cities by number of billionaires
 List of countries by the number of billionaires
 List of universities by number of billionaire alumni
 List of wealthiest families
 List of wealthiest historical figures
 Millionaire
 The World's Billionaires

References

Further reading 
 Ritholtz, Barry (26 December 2016). "Map of World Billionaires by Country and by Origin of Wealth". The Big Picture.

External links 
 

 
Distribution of wealth
Forbes lists